Deepak Vasant Kesarkar is a member of the 14th Maharashtra Legislative Assembly. He is the Cabinet Minister for Ministry of Education and Ministry of Marathi Language. He represents the Sawantwadi Assembly Constituency. He belongs to Shivsena.  He was appointed Maharashtra's minister of state for Finance, Rural Development in December, 2014. He is also guardian minister of Sindhudurg district.

Positions held
 2009: Elected to Maharashtra Legislative Assembly (1st term)
 2014: Re-Elected to Maharashtra Legislative Assembly (2nd term)
 2014: Minister of State for Finance, Rural Development in Maharashtra State Government
 2014: Guardian minister of Sindhudurg district
 2016: Minister of State for Home (Rural), Finance and Planning in Maharashtra State Government
 2019: Elected to Maharashtra Legislative Assembly
 2022: Minister for Ministry of School Education (Maharashtra) and Ministry of Marathi Language.

See also
 Devendra Fadnavis ministry

References

External links
 official website
  Shivsena Home Page 
 http://www.rediff.com/news/report/fadnavis-ministry-expansion-sees-mix-of-old-and-new-faces/20141205.htm
 http://www.dnaindia.com/mumbai/report-maharashtra-cm-devendra-fadnavis-team-portfolios-allocated-bjp-retains-key-departments-2041510
 Profile of Maharashtra government ministers 

Maharashtra MLAs 2014–2019
Living people
Shiv Sena politicians
People from Sindhudurg district
Marathi politicians
1955 births